Verdena is the self-titled debut album by the Italian band Verdena, released on September 24, 1999.

Track listing
Ovunque (3.06)
Valvonauta (4.23)
Pixel (4.23)
L'infinita gioia di Henry Bahus (4.30)
Vera (2.41)
Dentro Sharon (3.33)
Caramel pop (4.08)
Viba (3.47)
Ultranoia (4.55)
Zoe (3.26)
Bambina in nero (2.56)
Eyeliner (6.52)
Ormogenia (3.01) (only in LP press)

References

1999 debut albums
Universal Music Italy albums
Verdena albums